Airports Corporation of Vietnam (ACV) is a Vietnamese joint-stock company with 95.4% state-owned shares, based in Ho Chi Minh City. The company, operated under the Ministry of Transport of Vietnam, was founded on January 8, 2012 when three companies operating airports in the north, the middle, and the south of Vietnam were merged on February 28, 2012.

The company manages and operates 21 all civil airports in Vietnam, including eight international and thirteen domestic airports. Its headquarter is located at Tan Son Nhat International Airport, the busiest airport in Vietnam.

References

External links

Aviation in Vietnam
Transport companies established in 2012
Government-owned companies of Vietnam
Companies based in Ho Chi Minh City
2012 establishments in Vietnam
Airport operators